Anton Eisenhoit (sometimes Eisenhout), a German painter and engraver, flourished at Rome about 1590. He was a native of Warburg, and was still living in 1619. It appears that he has been miscalled Eisenhart by Christ, and that some of his works have been ascribed to other masters. Brulliot refers to some attributed to Luca Ciamberlano by Bartsch, which he conjectures should be given to Eisenhoit.

References
 

16th-century births
17th-century deaths
People from Warburg
German artists